The Lebombo Mountains, also called Lubombo Mountains, are an , narrow range of mountains in Southern Africa. They stretch from Hluhluwe in KwaZulu-Natal in the south to Punda Maria in the Limpopo Province in South Africa in the north. Parts of the mountain range are also found in Mozambique and Eswatini.

Description

Geologically, the range is considered a monocline; part of a rifted volcanic margin.  The Lebombo monocline was aligned with the Explora Escarpment off-shore Dronning Maud Land, Antarctica, before the break-up of Gondwana. The Lebombo monocline strikes N-S and dips to the east. It is composed of a sequence of Jurassic age volcanic rock, both basaltic lavas and rhyolitic flows and tuffs. The sequence rests on essentially horizontal Karoo Supergroup sedimentary rocks of the Kalahari Craton to the west and is overlain by Cretaceous to recent sediments to the east. The alternating resistant rhyolite and easily eroded basalts produce a series of parallel sharp cuesta ridges separated by savanna plains.

The highest peak is the  Mount Mananga. The  Longwe is the highest point in the Lebombo Range north of the Letaba River.

The mountains dominate Lubombo District in Eswatini. Towns in the area include Siteki in the centre, Lubhuku in the west and Mayaluka and Big Bend in the south with the Lusutfu River running past the southern region of the mountain range. At the north lie the towns of Simunye, Tambankulu and Namaacha, and the Mlawula Nature Reserve as well as the Mbuluzi River.

A number of rivers, including the Pongola, Mkuze, and Lusutfu, cross the mountains from west to east.

The name of the mountains is derived from the Zulu word ubombo meaning "big nose".

Protected areas
Kruger National Park and Phongolo Nature Reserve protect part of the range.

See also
 Explora Escarpment - an escarpment off the coast of Antarctica which was aligned with the mountains before the breakup of Gondwana.

References

External links
Preliminary overview of mountains in South Africa

Mountain ranges of South Africa
Mountain ranges of Mozambique
Mountains of Eswatini
Lubombo Region
Mozambique–South Africa border
Eswatini–Mozambique border
Landforms of KwaZulu-Natal
Mountain ranges of Limpopo